Lake Chrissie is a lake in Msukaligwa Local Municipality, Mpumalanga, South Africa. The lake is named after Christiana Pretorius, daughter of Marthinus Wessel Pretorius, first president of the boer Transvaal Republic. The lake is also informally known as "Matotoland" (meaning "land of frogs") and its swazi name is "Kachibibi" (meaning "big lake").

A famous battle of the Second Boer War was fought by Lake Chrissie on 6 February 1901.

See also
 Chrissiesmeer, a local settlement

Footnotes

References
 Encyclopædia Britannica entry on Lake Chrissie
 Chrissiesmeer at Routes Travel Info

Chrissie
Landforms of Mpumalanga